Variraptor ("Var thief") is a genus of dromaeosaurid theropod dinosaur from the Late Cretaceous of France.

Discovery

Between 1992 and 1995 amateur paleontologists Patrick Méchin and Annie Méchin-Salessy uncovered the remains of a small theropod in the Grès à Reptiles Formation (Campanian-Maastrichtian) at La Bastide Neuve, near Fox-Amphoux. The first finds were in 1992 assigned to the dubious theropod genus Elopteryx. A second article, in 1997, concluded they represented a new species. In 1998 this was named by Jean Le Loeuff and Eric Buffetaut as the type species Variraptor mechinorum. The generic name is derived from Latin Varus, referring to the Var River in the Alpes-Maritimes department in the Provence region of southern France, and raptor meaning "thief". The specific name honours the Méchin couple.

The genus is based on three type specimens: a posterior dorsal vertebra (MDE-D168), a sacrum (MDE-D169) with five fused vertebrae, and an ilium (CM-645). The specimens are part of the collection of the Musée des Dinosaures d'Espéraza and the private Collection Méchin. Additional referred material includes a right humerus (MDE-D158) with a well-developed deltopectoral crest, suggesting a raptorial function for the forearm. Other attributed bones include a femur and various vertebrae.

Description

The incomplete remains have dromaeosaurid features in the shape of the vertebrae and the humerus, with some resemblances to Deinonychus.

Classification
In 2000 Ronan Allain and Philippe Taquet named a second small theropod from the same layers: Pyroraptor. They also claimed that Variraptor was a nomen dubium because the type lacked any single diagnostic trait. Alan Turner and Peter Makovicky supported this conclusion in their 2012 review of dromaeosaurid systematics.

In 2009 Buffetaut and Phomphen Chanthasit defended the validity of Variraptor, arguing the type had a unique combination of traits. The lack of overlapping parts would make it impossible to establish whether Pyroraptor was a junior subjective synonym but the presence of two different types of ulna in the southern French dromaeosaurid material would indicate two separate species.

Le Loeuff and Buffetaut described Variraptor as a maniraptoran theropod, a member of the Dromaeosauridae, and this has been commonly accepted. However, in 2000 Oliver Rauhut was doubtful, assigning it to the more inclusive Coelurosauria.

The only time Variraptor has been included in a phylogenetic analysis was in a study describing the troodontid Hesperornithoides, where it was recovered as the sister taxon of Bambiraptor, within an expanded Microraptoria. However, the authors of this study stated that a position within the Unenlagiidae was also possible, only requiring three extra steps in their matrix.

See also

 Timeline of dromaeosaurid research

References

Dromaeosaurs
Maastrichtian life
Late Cretaceous dinosaurs of Europe
Cretaceous France
Fossils of France
Fossil taxa described in 1998
Taxa named by Éric Buffetaut